No Dough Boys is a 1944 short subject directed by Jules White starring American slapstick comedy team The Three Stooges (Moe Howard, Larry Fine and Curly Howard). It is the 82nd entry in the series released by Columbia Pictures starring the comedians, who released 190 shorts for the studio between 1934 and 1959.

Plot
The Stooges are dressed in yellowface as Japanese soldiers for a photo shoot; their boss (John Tyrrell) tells them to go on a lunch break but they have to keep their costumes on to finish the photo shoot quickly.

Meanwhile, in the restaurant the Stooges are about to go to, the manager reads a headline in the newspaper that states a Japanese submarine was destroyed offshore and three Japanese soldiers had escaped. When the Stooges arrive, the owner thinks they are the Japanese and attacks the Stooges, but they manage to escape. When they escape into the alley, they accidentally activate a hidden door. When they get inside, they meet a Nazi spy named Hugo (Vernon Dent) who mistakes them for the three Japanese, Naki (Larry), Saki (Moe), and Waki (Curly), that escaped. Just as Hugo is about to introduce them to some ladies, Curly accidentally calls them "dames" which makes Hugo realize that they are not the Japanese, but he plays along anyway.

In order to prove themselves, the Stooges have to teach the ladies jujitsu and do acrobatic tricks. When the real Japanese arrive, the Stooges fight them, but they keep turning the lights on and off, leading them to fight the wrong persons. At the end, the Stooges come out victorious.

Cast

Credited
 Moe Howard as Moe
 Larry Fine as Larry
 Curly Howard as Curly
 Vernon Dent as Hugo 
 Christine McIntyre as Celia Zweiback

Uncredited
 Kelly Flint as Amelia Schwartzbrot
 Judy Malcolm as Stelia Pumpernickel
 Brian O'Hara as Waiter
 John Tyrrell as Photographer
 Warren Kening as Joe the photoshoot model
 William Yip as Waki
 Joe Chan as Saki 
 Orson Tanaka as Naki

Production notes
No Dough Boys was filmed on April 25–28, 1944. The film title is a play on "No-No Boys," Japanese-Americans who answered "no" to a two-part loyalty question that asked them to renounce the Japanese emperor and agree to serve in the U.S. Armed Forces. It is also a play on the nickname for American infantrymen in the previous world war, known as a doughboy.

During World War II, the Stooges made a few comedies that engaged in propaganda against the Empire of Japan, including Spook Louder, Booby Dupes, No Dough Boys and The Yoke's on Me.

The gag of smoking an imaginary pipe was used twice by Laurel and Hardy: 1937's Way Out West and 1938's Block-Heads.

Curly's utterance of "Manchewie" is likely a reference to the World War II nation of "Manchuko", the Japanese puppet state founded by the Empire of Japan after its occupation of Manchuria.

References

External links 
 
 
No Dough Boys at threestooges.net

1944 films
1944 comedy films
The Three Stooges films
American World War II propaganda shorts
American black-and-white films
Films directed by Jules White
Columbia Pictures short films
American comedy short films
1940s English-language films
1940s American films